The 1985–86 Michigan State Spartans men's ice hockey team represented Michigan State University in college ice hockey. In its 7th year under head coach Ron Mason the team compiled a 34–9–2 record and reached the NCAA tournament for the eighth time in its history. The Spartans defeated Harvard 6–5 in the championship game at the Providence Civic Center in Providence, Rhode Island.

Season
Michigan State entered the 1985–86 season looking for a bit of redemption. After winning the previous four conference tournament titles, but failing to make it past the national quarterfinals three times, Ron Mason was beginning to be pegged as a great coach who couldn't get his team over the hump. Though Michigan State lost its top three scorers from the year before they did return the goaltending tandem of Bob Essensa and Norm Foster who had helped the Spartans set a new NCAA record with 38 wins. With so few seniors on the squad, the captaincy went to junior defenseman Don McSween. While the roster was a little light on four-year players, Michigan State did bring in one of the most highly touted prospects in Joe Murphy along with 7 other freshmen who would see significant ice time with the Spartans.

Early season struggles
MSU got off to a good start with a pair of road wins over Ohio State before splitting a home-and-home with a surging Western Michigan squad. After three wins and a tie against lesser programs, the Spartans took on arch-rival Michigan and split another home-and-home series. After a week of exhibition matches against the Canadian National Team MSU again split a weekend series and while their home record was stellar they had dropped to 3–3 on the road. That mark wasn't improved when they split another road series against the normally hapless Illinois–Chicago and then dropped both road games against a good  Lake Superior State team. The Spartans were able to recover a bit in the conference standings with a pair of home wins against the Buckeyes and lift their record to 11–6–1 before losing in their first non-conference game of the year to the former CCHA team Northern Michigan, their only home loss of the season.

Great Lakes Invitational
Michigan State entered the Great Lakes Invitational having won the previous 3 years but the team was in need of a shock to the system to shake it out of its doldrums. They got just that when they were pushed to the limit in the semifinal by WCHA bottom-feeder Michigan Tech, escaping with a 2–1 win in overtime. The next night it was almost as if a different team hit the ice when the Spartans cruised to an 8–3 win in the championship over defending national champions Rensselaer. Don McSween was named MVP of the tournament.

Charging up the standings
Michigan State had a good deal of ground to make up in the second half of their season and the kicked it off with a sweep of Western Michigan and Miami they were slowed down by Ferris State and Michigan who provided MSU with a tie and loss respectively, but the Spartans were buoyed by playing 7 of their final 8 games at home and they took every game to finish the season at 23–7–2 in CCHA play, one win ahead of both Western Michigan and Bowling Green. The biggest standout for the year was former walk-on Mike Donnelly who had amassed a huge number of goals and was beginning to draw attention from NHL scouts.

CCHA tournament
The Spartans entered the CCHA tournament against Michigan and while the Wolverines had beaten MSU twice both had been in the Wolverine's arena and with Michigan State playing host the Spartans were able to drop Michigan in both games to take the quarterfinal series. Michigan State headed down the road to Detroit for the championship rounds, and faced stiff competition from lake Superior State but the Spartans edged out the Lakers 3–2 in overtime. In the championship game the following night MSU's offense, which finished second-best in the nation, failed them and they could only manage a single goal against Western Michigan's Bill Horn, ending their 4-year reign as CCHA tournament champion.

NCAA tournament
Fortunately, the Spartans had played well enough over the course of the season to earn an at-large bid to the NCAA tournament. They had played so well, in fact, that they were seeded ahead of Western Michigan and would play at home in the quarterfinal round. MSU used the massive home advantage they had to beat Boston College in both games and advance to the Frozen Four. In the semifinal MSU was met by perennial power Minnesota who had upset the top eastern seed Boston University in the quarters. Both teams were built around scoring and that fact shone through the game; Michigan State won the match 6–4 with Norm Foster turning aside 42 shots.

With the win Michigan State made its first championship game in 20 years and only had Harvard left to stop them. Before the game had even started, however, MSU gained an advantage over the Crimson; Hobey Baker Award winner Scott Fusco had injured his knee in the other semifinal and couldn't play in the final. Despite missing their best player, Harvard got off to a fast start gaining a 2–0 lead by the 8-minute mark. MSU cut the lead in half at the end of the first but Allen Bourbeau scored his second goal of the night to give the Crimson their 2-goal lead back. Harvard's third goal was scored on just their seventh shot of the night and it looked as if the Spartans were outclassed. Not to be deterred, however, Jeff Parker cut the lead back to one with Bourbeau's third of the night coming 10 minutes later. Mike Donnelly scored his 58th goal of the season just before the end of the second to give MSU a fighting change in the final period.

Sure enough MSU's offense came through when needed and two freshman found the back of the net before the three-minute mark to give the Spartans their first lead of the night. Harvard responded with  the tying goal four minutes later and the two teams fought furiously to regain the lead. with just under three minutes to play Donnelly scored his second of the game to give MSU the lead and the Spartans held on to win the national championship.

Awards and honors
Mike Donnelly was awarded the Tournament MOP and was joined by Norm Foster, Don McSween and  Jeff Parker on the All-Tournament Team. Donnelly was also named to the AHCA All-American West First Team while McSween was named to the Second Team. Donnelly and McSween both made it onto the All-CCHA First Team while Bob Essensa made the Second team. Joe Murphy was awarded the CCHA Rookie of the Year and would become the first college player to be take first overall in the NHL Entry Draft. Murphy was joined by 12 of his teammates from the 1985–86 Spartans, an astounding number of NHL players for a college team.

Mike Donnelly's 59 goals was the highest total scored since the NCAA created Division I in 1973. Only Phil Latreille has scored more in a season, doing so in the early 1960s, before there were any divisions in college ice hockey.

Rick Tosto became the first player in NCAA history to win national titles with two separate teams. After winning with Renssealer in 1985 he transferred closer to his home of Dearborn Heights, Michigan and won with the Spartans.

Standings

Schedule

|-
!colspan=12 style=";" | Regular Season

|-
!colspan=12 style=";" | 

|-
!colspan=12 style=";" | 

|- align="center" bgcolor="#e0e0e0"
|colspan=12|Michigan State Wins Series 9-5

|-
!colspan=12 style=";" | 

|- align="center" bgcolor="#e0e0e0"
|colspan=12|Michigan State Wins Series 10-6

Roster and scoring statistics

Goaltending statistics

1986 championship game

(W2) Michigan State vs. (E2) Harvard

Players drafted into the NHL

1986 NHL Entry Draft

† incoming freshman

References

Michigan State Spartans men's ice hockey seasons
Michigan State
Michigan State
Michigan State
Michigan State
Michigan State
Michigan State